Khoksi is a village. It lies on Bariyarpatti  Rural municipality in Siraha District in Province No. 2 of south-eastern Nepal. It is surrounded by Jankinagar from the east, Sripur from the north, Bariyarpatti from the west and Gargamma from the south. At the time of the 1991 Nepal census it had a population of 2166 people living in 391 individual households. Before it was under the Village development committee, of Jankinagar Nepal in 1991 Nepal census. Now it lies under the Bariyarpatti Rural Municipality -2. It is divided into four areas (Tolas): Purab Tola (East Area) or (Chouk), Musalman Tola (Muslim Area), Koriyani (West Area), and Baniya Tola (Middle Area). It is Hindu Muslim and Christian-dominated village with a population of 2166. The ward commissioner of Bariyarpatti Rural Municipality from Ward No 2 is Bijay Kumar Mahato who took office from 25 September 2017.

References

Populated places in Siraha District